Borbély ("barber") is a Hungarian surname. Notable people with this name include:
 Alexander Borbély (born 1939), Hungarian-born Swiss scientist, highly cited and well known for his sleep research
 Balázs Borbély (born 1979), Slovak footballer of Hungarian ethnicity
 Csaba Borbély (born 1980), Romanian professional football player of Hungarian ethnicity
 László Borbély (born 1954), Romanian economist and politician of Hungarian ethnicity
 Zsanett Borbély (born 1978), Hungarian handball player

Hungarian words and phrases
Hungarian-language surnames
Occupational surnames